The 1991 Open Championship was a men's major golf championship and the 120th Open Championship, held from 18 to 21 July at Royal Birkdale Golf Club in Southport, England. Ian Baker-Finch won his only major championship, two strokes ahead of runner-up Mike Harwood.

Baker-Finch was two-over after two rounds in a tie for 28th place, then was ten-under on the weekend. His 66 on Sunday was bolstered by a 29 on the front nine, with birdies on five of the first seven holes.

The cut at 148 (+8) included those within ten strokes of the lead, which resulted in a record 113 players on the weekend, nearly three-quarters of the field.

Course

Source:
Lengths of the course for previous Opens (since 1950):

 1983: , par 71  
 1976: , par 72
 1971: , par 73

 1965: , par 73
 1961:    
 1954:

Past champions in the field

Made the cut

Source:

Missed the cut

Source:

Round summaries

First round
Thursday, 18 July 1991

Source:

Second round
Friday, 19 July 1991

Source:
Amateurs: Mickelson (+4), Payne (+4), Allenby (+9), Roblin (+11), Coltart (+13), Evans (+13), Muntz (+14), Wilshire (+15).

Third round
Saturday, 20 July 1991

Source:

Final round
Sunday, 21 July 1991

Source:
Amateurs: Payne (+4), Mickelson (+8)

References

External links
Royal Birkdale 1991 (Official site)
120th Open Championship - Royal Birkdale (European Tour)

The Open Championship
Golf tournaments in England
Open Championship
Open Championship
Open Championship